Colobothea brullei is a species of beetle in the family Cerambycidae. It was described by Gahan in 1889. It is known from Bolivia, Paraguay, Ecuador, Peru and Brazil.

References

brullei
Beetles described in 1889